Ardian is an Albanian name. Although similar to Adrian, a name of Latin origin, the Albanian name Ardian (Ardjan and Ardijan being other variants) is a derivation of Ardiaei, the name of an ancient Illyrian people.
Their original inland residence was along the Naro River (modern river Neretva, also known as Narenta in ancient times) up to the Konjic region, in present-day Bosnia and Herzegovina.

Etymology

Both the name of the ancient Illyrian people 'Ardiaei', and  the personal name 'Ardian' have the same root - ardia. The Albanian word that corresponds most closely  to the root-word 'ardia' is ardhja, meaning the future, arrival or descent, by which Ardian would therefore be "the one that arrives or descends from...", or simply the descendant/offspring. However, one certainly ought to consider all other possible etymologies for Ardiaei, which in this form certainly belongs to Latin transliteration,  in order to reach any tangible conclusion. When it comes to ancient Latin linguistic legacy, which should certainly be taken in consideration when transliterating ancient Illyrian words and names, one of the closest visible linguistic matches to 'Ardiaei' (and its Albanian derivative 'Ardian/Ardijan') seems to be ardea, Latin word for heron.  There is a town in Bosnia and Herzegovina situated in the wider Neretva valley region (the original homeland of ancient Illyrian people of Ardiaei) called Čapljina and its name derives from čaplja, which in former Serbo-Croatian language (nowadays divided into Bosnian/Croatian/Montenegrin and Serbian) precisely means 'heron'. The Latin word for heron is ardea, a word that bears striking similarity with the name of Ardiaei, and it might possibly be its cognate. This theory opens up many possibilities for the interpretation of the original homeland of the Ardiaei and the etymology of their name. For example, heron might have had totemic pagan value among local Illyrians, due to its presence in this area, and it is not implausible to conclude that one of those Illyrian peoples named itself after a heron, the Ardiaei. The Latin word ardea might be a Latin translation of some original Illyrian word for 'heron' that Romans found  when they settled in this area, or the 'ardea' itself, could have been an Illyrian word taken by Romans, who might have slightly altered it and integrated it into their language, the Latin. Indeed, the word Ardiaei is found in ancient Greek sources predating the arrival of Romans and their language to the Illyrian lands. It is also possible that ancient Illyrians or Romans named this place 'the place of  heron(s), and the Slavic settlers, who settled in the former Illyrian lands around the 6th century A.D. translated the name of this place into their language(s), which in turn gave 'Čapljina', "the place of heron(s)".In any case, this is just one of so many other different possibilities in terms of identifying potential etymologies for 'Ardiaei', and further and detailed interdisciplinary study should be carried out in order to reach any viable conclusion. Some other suggested etymologies for Ardiaei include the ancient Greek ardis, meaning ‘head of the arrow, sting’, ‘vardia’, Greek for ‘watch/duty/shift’ (‘guard’ implicit), corresponding directly to ‘Vardaei’, another name for Ardiaei, one other variant of Ardiaei, bears similarity with the name of the Vardar river in Macedonia, so this could be yet another area to explore. However, one should bear in mind that Greek historian Strabo says in paragraph 6 (Book 7, chapter 5) of his Geographica: “The Ardiaei were called by the men of later times "Vardiaei", which implies that the word Ardiaioi, as the Greek called them, preceded the name of Vardaei.

Ardiana is a feminine form of this name. Abbreviated forms like Ardi and Ardia are in use too.

List of people
Notable people with the name include:

Ardian Behari (born 1973), Albanian footballer and coach
Ardian Bujupi (born 1991), Albanian singer and songwriter
Ardian Cuculi (born 1987), ethnic Albanian footballer from Macedonia
Ardian Gashi (born 1981), Kosovar-Norwegian footballer
Ardian Fullani (born 1955), former governor of the Bank of Albania
Ardian Gjokaj (born 1979), ethnic Albanian footballer from Montenegro
Ardian Klosi (1957–2012), Albanian publicist, albanologist, writer, translator and social activist
Adrian Kollozi ( 2009–2011), Albanian politician
Ardian Kozniku (born 1967), ethnic Albanian footballer from Kosovo
Ardian Mema (born 1971), Albanian footballer
Ardian Pepa (born 1977), Albanian sculptor and painter
Ardian Rexhepi (born 1993), ethnic Albanian footballer from Sweden
Ardian Syaf, Indonesia comic book artist
Ardian Turku, Albanian politician, member of the Parliament of Albania, and former mayor of Elbasan
Ardian Vehbiu (born 1959), Albanian author and translator
Ardiana Leka Sinoimeri (born 1956), Albanian translator/interpreter/book editor/professor of English, Polytechnic University/professor of Albanian, USA]]

References

Albanian masculine given names